Eric Gustafson may refer to:

Eric Gustafson (actor), Swedish actor

See also
Nils-Eric Gustafsson (1922–2017), Swedish Centre Party politician
Erik Gustafson (disambiguation)
Erik Gustafsson (disambiguation)